The 2014 NHL Winter Classic was an outdoor ice hockey game played in the National Hockey League (NHL) on January 1, 2014, at Michigan Stadium in Ann Arbor, Michigan. The sixth edition of the Winter Classic, it matched the Toronto Maple Leafs against the Detroit Red Wings; the Maple Leafs defeated the Red Wings, 3–2, in a shootout to move past the Red Wings in the Atlantic Division. The game was televised nationally in Canada on CBC and nationally in the United States on NBC. The game set an NHL attendance record of 105,491, surpassing the previous record set during the 2008 NHL Winter Classic.

The game was originally planned to be played on January 1, 2013, as the 2013 NHL Winter Classic, but was postponed until the following year due to the 2012–13 NHL lockout. The 2014 Winter Classic was one of six outdoor games held during the 2013–14 NHL season, which included the new 2014 NHL Stadium Series of four games and the 2014 Heritage Classic. These six games served as the NHL's premiere showcase games for the season as there was no All Star Game due to the 2014 Winter Olympics.

The event was the first Winter Classic to be held at a stadium dedicated solely to college football. It was also the first whose festivities were split between two locations, as the NHL Alumni Showdown and other side events were held on a second rink constructed at Comerica Park in downtown Detroit.

Background

Initial announcement

After the success of "The Big Chill at the Big House" at Michigan Stadium on December 11, 2010, where Michigan's hockey team defeated Michigan State University, 5–0, outdoors in front of 104,173 spectators, interest began in also holding an NHL Winter Classic game there. On February 8, 2012, the University of Michigan Board of Regents authorized athletic director Dave Brandon to negotiate a contract with the NHL regarding the Winter Classic. On February 9, 2012, the NHL announced at Comerica Park that the 2013 Classic would take place at Michigan Stadium, while the Great Lakes Invitational would take place at Comerica Park. Some OHL and AHL games were also slated to be played at Comerica Park.

The NHL Alumni Showdown coaches were named on July 26, 2012. Former Red Wings coach Scotty Bowman along with assistant Barry Smith were to coach the Red Wings' alumni team. The pair of Bowman and Smith coached three Stanley Cup wins in Detroit. Former Maple Leaf coach Pat Quinn was to coach the Maple Leafs' alumni team, along with Red Kelly, Hall of Fame player and former Maple Leafs' coach.

The Red Wings-Maple Leafs matchup, an Original Six era rivalry, was the first time a United States city's team and a Canadian city's team faced each other in an outdoor NHL game. U.S. teams had not competed in the outdoor Heritage Classic games since their inception in 2003, and Canadian teams had not played in the Winter Classic, which the Heritage Classic spawned in 2009. The unexpectedly high television viewership from the 2011 Stanley Cup Finals (which featured the Vancouver Canucks against the Boston Bruins) prompted the league and NBC to reconsider the conventional wisdom that a contest featuring a Canadian team would not draw as well as two U.S. teams in the United States. (NBC ratings do not count the network's millions of Canadian viewers.) It was this reconsideration that prompted an Ontario-Michigan Winter Classic.

Cancellation and postponement

On November 2, 2012, the NHL cancelled the game due to the 2012–13 NHL lockout. The date for the cancellation came as a result of a deadline in the league's contract with Michigan Stadium, in which the league would have incurred additional expenses if they cancelled after November 2. During the announcement, NHL Deputy Commissioner Bill Daly stated that the 2014 Winter Classic and associated events would be awarded to Ann Arbor and Detroit and would also feature the Maple Leafs and Red Wings. The NHL then officially announced the game on April 7, 2013.

A divisional re-alignment that occurred the preceding offseason also made the Red Wings and Maple Leafs divisional rivals in the new Atlantic Division, which was renamed from the Northeast Division (the old Atlantic Division became the Metropolitan Division). Had the Winter Classic been played in 2013, it would have been the only meeting between the teams, as both were in separate conferences at the time (as division rivals, they can meet 4-5 times a year, ultimately playing 30 times over a seven-year period).

Game summary

The game remained scoreless until Daniel Alfredsson scored for the Red Wings at 13:14 of the second period. James van Riemsdyk tied the game for the Leafs with 37 seconds left in the second period. Early in the third, Tyler Bozak gave Toronto the lead. Justin Abdelkader then tied the game with 5:22 in regulation. The game eventually went into a shootout, where Bozak's goal proved to be the difference.

Number in parenthesis represents the player's total in goals or assists to that point of the season

Team rosters

 James Reimer and Petr Mrazek dressed as the back-up goaltenders. Neither entered the game.

Scratches
Toronto Maple Leafs: Mark Fraser, John-Michael Liles, Frazer McLaren
Detroit Red Wings: Mikael Samuelsson, Jonas Gustavsson, Darren Helm

Officials 
 Referees — Dan O'Halloran, Brian Pochmara
 Linesmen — Scott Driscoll, Mark Shewchyk

Liles trade

Despite taking the warmup and initially being pencilled in as a healthy scratch, John-Michael Liles found out early in the game that he had in fact been traded to the Carolina Hurricanes, alongside Dennis Robertson, for Tim Gleason.  Gleason made his Leafs debut on January 7, 2014.  Liles scored against his former team two days after Gleason's debut in a 6-1 Carolina win.

Television ratings
The combined average television viewership for the 2014 NHL Winter Classic on NBC in the U.S., and CBC and RDS in Canada was 8.234 million viewers in North America, becoming the most watched regular season game ever. The previous highest combined average television viewership was 6.6 million viewers for the 2011 NHL Winter Classic. The 4.404 million average viewers for NBC's broadcast in the U.S. was the second-largest audience for an NHL regular season game since 1975. The 3.57 million average viewers for CBC's broadcast in Canada was the largest audience ever for an NHL regular season game in Canadian broadcast history. The game garnered a 2.5 rating, tying the 2009 NHL Winter Classic as the highest-rated NHL regular season game since 1975. The rating and viewership for the game were up 19% and 18%, respectively, compared to the 2012 NHL Winter Classic.

Entertainment
Musical guests for the 2014 Winter Classic included The Zac Brown Band and Mayer Hawthorne.

Hockeytown Winter Festival

Comerica Park served as the venue for the 2013 Hockeytown Winter Festival, a two-week event that took place in Detroit leading up to the 2014 NHL Winter Classic. As part of this event, on December 27–28, the 2013 Great Lakes Invitational four-game tournament was held, with Western Michigan emerging as champion over in-state rival Michigan Tech. On December 29, two OHL games were played, the first between the Windsor Spitfires and the Saginaw Spirit, and the second between the London Knights and the Plymouth Whalers. These were the first outdoor regular season games for the OHL. The Spitfires won the first game 6–5, while a shootout was required for the second game, with the Whalers getting the 2–1 win. On December 30, in front of 20,337 fans, the AHL affiliates of the Detroit Red Wings and the Toronto Maples Leafs, the Grand Rapids Griffins and the Toronto Marlies played to a shootout, with the Marlies holding the 4–3 edge. This was the seventh outdoor AHL game.

Alumni Showdown
As part of the Hockeytown Winter Festival, two consecutive alumni games were played between former players of the Red Wings and the Maple Leafs on December 31. The Detroit Red Wings swept the doubleheader, winning the first alumni game 5–4, and the second alumni game 6–5, following a shootout, in front of 33,425 in attendance at Comerica Park.

In the first alumni game of the doubleheader, Jiri Fischer scored the first goal of the game on a pass from Jason Woolley just 1 minute, 20 seconds into the game. Less than one minute later, Kevin Miller's goal gave the Red Wings a 2–0 lead. The Leafs then got goals from Stew Gavin and Todd Warriner, to tie the game at 2–2. Petr Klima then gave the Red Wings a one-goal lead when he scored on a pass from Martin Lapointe with 4:04 left in the first period.

In the second period, Pat Verbeek's goal from Miller and Mathieu Schneider gave the Red Wings a 4–2 lead with 15:40 left in the second. Aaron Ward scored the eventual game-winner from Fischer and Jimmy Carson with 11:50 left before the Maple Leafs mounted a comeback on goals by Brad May, and Tom Fergus who made it a one-goal game with 2:31 remaining in the second period. The Leafs pulled their goalie for the extra attacker with a minute left. Then, Red Wings coach Scotty Bowman sent 74-year-old Red Berenson, Michigan's head coach, to take the face off with 14.3 seconds left. Berenson was one of two players who participated in the Alumni Showdown who actually started his NHL career in the Original Six era. The other was 68-year-old center Mike Walton, who began his career with the Leafs in 1965.

Prior to the second alumni game of the doubleheader, former linemates Gordie Howe and Ted Lindsay dropped the first puck in a ceremonial faceoff between former captains Steve Yzerman of the Red Wings and Darryl Sittler of the Maple Leafs. Vladimir Konstantinov was then helped onto the ice for a rare Russian Five reunion with his former teammates, Sergei Fedorov, Viacheslav Fetisov, Vyacheslav Kozlov and Igor Larionov. Joe Kocur honored his late Bruise Brother by wearing Bob Probert's number 24 in the second alumni game.

In the second alumni game, goals by Doug Brown, Chris Chelios, Sergei Fedorov, Nicklas Lidstrom and Brendan Shanahan gave the Red Wings a 5–1 lead early in the second period. Three straight unanswered goals from Shayne Corson, Tie Domi and Steve Thomas cut the Red Wings' lead to one goal. Bryan McCabe then scored with two seconds left in regulation, to send the game to a shootout. During the shootout, Tomas Holmstrom scored Detroit's lone goal, to give them the 6–5 victory.

Alumni showdown rosters

Game 1

Toronto Maple Leafs
Coaches: Red Kelly and Pat Quinn

Detroit Red Wings
Coaches: Scotty Bowman and Barry Smith.
Ambassadors: Gordie Howe, Ted Lindsay and Vladimir Konstantinov.

Game 2

Toronto Maple Leafs
Coaches: Red Kelly, Johnny Bower and Pat Quinn

Detroit Red Wings
Coaches: Scotty Bowman and Barry Smith.
Ambassadors: Gordie Howe, Ted Lindsay and Vladimir Konstantinov.

See also
NHL Centennial Classic, a 2017 re-match of the game at BMO Field in Toronto.
List of outdoor ice hockey games

References

External links

NHL Winter Classic 2014 Red Wings - Leafs 01/01/2014 Full Game Replay of the 2014 NHL Winter Classic

NHL Winter Classic
NHL Winter Classic
Win
Detroit Red Wings games
Toronto Maple Leafs games
Winter
Sports in Ann Arbor, Michigan
Ice hockey competitions in Michigan